The women's K-2 500 metres event was a pairs kayaking event conducted as part of the Canoeing at the 1960 Summer Olympics program on Lake Albano. This event debuted at these Olympics though it is one of two events that has been at every ICF Canoe Sprint World Championships (the other is the men's K-4 1000 m event which debuted at the 1964 Games in Tokyo and ran until the 2016 Games in Rio de Janeiro.).

Medalists

Results

Heats
The 11 crews first raced in two heats on August 26. The top three finishers from each of the heats advanced directly to the final; the remaining five teams were relegated to the repechage.

Repechage
The top three finishers in the repechage (raced on August 27) advanced to the final.

Final
The final was held on August 29.

References
1960 Summer Olympics official report Volume 2, Part 1. pp. 269–70.
International Canoe Federation historical results to 2006 (Olympic and world for all disciplines).
Sports-reference.com 1960 women's K-2 500 m results.

Women's K-2 500
Olympic
Women's events at the 1960 Summer Olympics